Chorthippus apricarius is a species of grasshopper in the subfamily Gomphocerinae. It is found across most of Europe.

References

apricarius
Orthoptera of Europe
Grasshoppers described in 1758
Taxa named by Carl Linnaeus